Year 149 (CXLIX) was a common year starting on Tuesday (link will display the full calendar) of the Julian calendar. At the time, it was known as the Year of the Consulship of Scipio and Priscus (or, less frequently, year 902 Ab urbe condita). The denomination 149 for this year has been used since the early medieval period, when the Anno Domini calendar era became the prevalent method in Europe for naming years.

Births 
 Sima Fang (or Jiangong), Chinese official and scholar of the Han Dynasty (d. 219)

Deaths

References